Beolhyu of Silla (died 196, r. 184–196) was the ninth king of Silla, one of the Three Kingdoms of Korea.  He is also known as Balhui Isageum, Isageum being the royal title in early Silla. As a descendant of Silla's 4th king Talhae, his surname was Seok.

Family

Grandfather: Talhae of Silla
Grandmother: Queen Ahyo, daughter of King Namhae (아효부인 박씨)
Father: Crown Prince Seok Gu-chu (태자 석구추)
Mother: Queen Jijinaelye of the Kim clan (지진내례부인 김씨)
Spouse:??
Son: Seok Goljeong (석골정)
Grandson: Jobun of Silla (r. 230–247, d.247), 11th ruler of Silla
Grandson: Cheomhae of Silla (r. 247–261,d.261) 12th ruler of Silla
Granddaughter: Lady Seok
Grandson: Seok Deungbo ( 석등보昔)
Son: Seok Imae (석이매)
Grandson: Naehae of Silla (d. 230, r.196–230)–10th ruler of Silla
Son: Seok Deungbo (석등보)
Grandson: Silseong of Silla (died 417) (r. 402–417), whose – was the 18th ruler of Silla

Background
The Samguk Sagi states that he was made king by the people when his predecessor Adalla died without heir. His accession to the throne broke several generations of continuous rule by the Park clan, descendants of Silla's founder Bak Hyeokgeose.

Beolhyu is recorded to be the grandson of King Talhae, but this is questioned because he ascended the throne 104 years after Talhae's death. His mother was of the Kim clan.

Reign
In 185, he conquered a small chiefdom called Somun-guk (in today's Uiseong). Silla warred with the neighboring Korean kingdom Baekje in 188 (around Jincheon), 189, and 190 (around Yecheon).

See also
Rulers of Korea
History of Korea
Three Kingdoms of Korea

References
The Academy of Korean Studies
Korea Britannica

Silla rulers
196 deaths
2nd-century monarchs in Asia
Year of birth unknown
2nd-century Korean people